The 5th Women's World Chess Championship took place during the 6th Chess Olympiad, held in Warsaw, Poland from 16 to 31 August 1935. The final results were as follows:

{| class="wikitable"
! # !!Player !!1 !! 2 !!3 !!4 !!5 !!6 !!7 !!8 !!9 !!10 !!Points
|- style="background:#ccffcc;"
| style="background:gold;"| 1 ||  || - || 1 || 1 || 1 || 1 || 1 || 1 || 1 || 1 || 1 || 9
|-
| style="background:silver;"| 2 ||  || 0 || - || ½ || ½ || 1 || 1 || 1 || ½ || 1 || 1 || 6½
|-
| style="background:#cc9966;"| 3 ||  || 0 || ½ || - || ½ || 1 || 1 || 1 || 1 || 0 || 1 || 6
|-
| 4 ||  || 0 || ½ || ½ || - || ½ || ½ || ½ || 1 || 1 || 1 || 5½
|-
| 5 ||   || 0 || 0 || 0 || ½ || - || 1 || 1 || ½ || 1 || 1 || 5
|-
| 6 ||  || 0 || 0 || 0 || ½ || 0 || - || 1 || 0 || 1 || 1 || 3½
|-
| 7 ||  || 0 || 0 || 0 || ½ || 0 || 0 || - || 1 || 1 || 1 || 3½
|-
| 8 ||  || 0 || ½ || 0 || 0 || ½ || 1 || 0 || - || 1 || 0 || 3
|-
| 9 ||  || 0 || 0 || 1 || 0 || 0 || 0 || 0 || 0 || - || ½ || 1½
|-
| 10 ||  || 0 || 0 || 0 || 0 || 0 || 0 || 0 || 1 || ½ || - || 1½
|}

References 

Women's World Chess Championships
1935 in chess
Chess in Poland
Sports competitions in Warsaw
20th century in Warsaw
1935 in Polish sport
1935 in women's sport